Aramayis Tonoyan (born 26 October 1969) is a retired Armenian football defender.

References

1969 births
Living people
Armenian footballers
Soviet footballers
Soviet Armenians
FC Ararat Yerevan players
FC Pyunik players
Sepahan S.C. footballers
FC Yerevan players
FC Mika players
Soviet Top League players
Association football defenders
Armenian expatriate footballers
Expatriate footballers in Iran
Armenian expatriate sportspeople in Iran
Armenia international footballers
Armenian football managers
FC Yerevan managers
FC Mika managers